This page lists Colonial Ministers of Imperial Germany.  With the loss of Germany's colonies in the Treaty of Versailles in 1919, the office was abolished.

Directors of the Colonial Department in the Foreign Secretariat (1890–1907)

State Secretaries for the Colonies (1907–1918)

Ministers for the Colonies (1918–1919)

See also
Imperial Colonial Office
 NSDAP Office of Colonial Policy
 Reichskolonialbund

External links
German Colonies in Africa
German Colonies in the Pacific

Colonial
German colonial empire
Germany